Wyllt is a surname. Notable people with the surname include:

 Cyledr Wyllt, warrior in Welsh mythology
 Myrddin Wyllt, prophet in Welsh mythology